Frewer is a surname. Notable people with the surname include:

 John Frewer (1883–1974), Anglican bishop in Australia
 Matt Frewer (born 1958), American Canadian actor

See also
 Brewer (surname)